The Princes of Polotsk ruled the Principality of Polotsk within the realm of Kievan Rus or within the Grand Duchy of Lithuania from the mid-9th century to 1307.

Rogvold, a non-Rurikid Varangian, was the first Prince of Polotsk.  When Vladimir the Great returned from exile in Scandinavia in 980 to try to claim the Kievan throne that his brother, Yaropolk, held, he sought an alliance with Rogvolod through a marriage with his daughter, Rogneda.  When she refused, calling Vladimir the "son of a slave," he attacked Polotsk, killed Rogvold and his son, and took Rogneda by force to be his wife.  Polotsk was then granted to Vladimir's son, Izyaslav, around the time of Christianization (988), and when Izyaslav predeceased his father in 1001, the throne of Polotsk was passed on to Izyaslav's son, Briacheslav, and the Polotsk line (the senior branch of Vladimir's sons) became izgoi and was not legally allowed to succeed to the Kievan throne, although Bryacheslav's son, Vseslav, held briefly the Kievan throne in 1068-1069, after it was granted to him by the veche following the Kiev Uprising.

List of princes of Polotsk
 Rogvolod, fl. 977

Rurikids / Izyaslavichi of Polotsk
 987–1001 Iziaslav I Vladimirovich
 1001–1003 Vseslav I Iziaslavich
 1003–1044 Briacheslav I Iziaslavich
 1044–1069 Vseslav II Briacheslavich
 1069 Vseslav II Briacheslavich, Sviatopolk I Iziaslavich and Mstislav I Iziaslavich
 1069–1071 Vseslav II Briacheslavich and Sviatopolk I Iziaslavich
 1071-1101 Vseslav II Briacheslavich (alone)
 1101–1129 Davyd Vseslavich
 1127–1128 Boris I Vseslavich
 1129–1132 Iziaslav II Mstislavich
 1132–1132 Sviatopolk II Mstislavich

Vseslavichi of Polotsk
 1132–1144 Vasilko Sviatoslavich (Prince of Vitebsk)
 1144–1151 Rogvolod Borisovich (Prince of Drutsk)
 1151–1159 Rostislav Glebovich (Prince of Minsk)
 1159–1162 Rogvolod Borisovich (again) 
 1162–1167 Vseslav III Vasilkovich (Prince of Vitebsk)
 1167–1167 Volodar Glebovich (Prince of Minsk)
 1167–1180 Vseslav III Vasilkovich (Prince of Vitebsk)
 1186–1215 Vladimir Vseslavich (Princes of Vitebsk)
 1215–1222 Boris II Vseslavich (Prince of Drutsk)
 1222–1232 Sviatoslav Mstislavich 
 1232–1242 Bryachislav II Vasilkovich (Prince of Vitebsk)

Lithuanian assimilation
 1252–1263 Tautvilas 
 1264–1267 Gerdine
 1267–1270 Iziaslav III of Vitebsk (?)
 1270–1290 Konstantin the Armless 
 1290–1307 occupation by the Livonian Order (Archbishopric of Riga)

Gediminids
 1307–1336 Vainius (Voin)
 1336–1345 Narimantas
 1345–1399 Andrei of Polotsk
 1377–1397 Skirgaila

Notes

References
 Алексеев Л. В. Полоцкая земля // Древнерусские княжества Х—XIII вв. — М., 1975., pp. 202—239.
 Богуславский В. В. Славянская энциклопедия. Киевская Русь — Московия: в 2 т. — М.: Олма-Пресс, 2001.
 Данилович В. Е. Очерк истории Полоцкой земли до конца XIV столетия. — К., 1896. p. 731
 Martin, Janet, Medieval Russia, 980-1584, Cambridge: Cambridge University Press, 1995
 Рыжов К. Все монархи мира. Россия. — Москва, Вече, 1998.
 Selart A.: ''Fürst Konstantin von Polock und die Geschichte Livlands im dritten Viertel des 13. Jahrhunderts, in: Forschungen zur baltischen Geschichte 2006, vol. 1.

External links
 Polotsk princes on litopys.org.ua

Polotsk
Noble titles of Kievan Rus
Princes of Polotsk